Ethics, Demonstrated in Geometrical Order, usually known as the Ethics, is a philosophical treatise written in Latin by Baruch Spinoza (Benedictus de Spinoza). It was written between 1661 and 1675 and was first published posthumously in 1677.

The book is perhaps the most ambitious attempt to apply the method of Euclid in philosophy. Spinoza puts forward a small number of definitions and axioms from which he attempts to derive hundreds of propositions and corollaries, such as "When the Mind imagines its own lack of power, it is saddened by it", "A free man thinks of nothing less than of death", and "The human Mind cannot be absolutely destroyed with the Body, but something of it remains which is eternal."

Summary

Part I: Of God
The first part of the book addresses the relationship between God and the universe. Spinoza was engaging with a tradition that held: God exists outside of the universe; God created the universe for a reason; and God could have created a different universe according to his will. Spinoza denies each point. According to Spinoza, God is the natural world. Spinoza concludes the following: God is the substance comprising the universe, with God existing in itself, not somehow outside of the universe; and the universe exists as it does from necessity, not because of a divine theological reason or will.

Spinoza argues through propositions. He holds their conclusion is merely the necessary logical conclusion from combining the provided Definitions and Axioms. He starts with the proposition that "there cannot exist in the universe two or more substances having the same nature or attribute." He follows this by arguing that objects and events must not merely be caused if they occur, but be prevented if they do not. By a logical contradiction, if something is non-contradictory, there is no reason that it should not exist. Spinoza builds from these starting ideas. If substance exists it must be infinite, because if not infinite another finite substance would have to exist to take up the remaining parts of its finite attributes, something which is impossible according to an earlier proposition. Spinoza then uses the Ontological Argument as justification for the existence of God and argues that God (which should be read as "nature", rather than traditional deity) must possess all attributes infinitely. Since no two things can share attributes, "besides God no substance can be granted or conceived."

As with many of Spinoza's claims, what this means is a matter of dispute. Spinoza claims that the things that make up the universe, including human beings, are God's "modes". This means that everything is, in some sense, dependent upon God. The nature of this dependence is disputed. Some scholars say that the modes are properties of God in the traditional sense. Others say that modes are effects of God. Either way, the modes are also logically dependent on God's essence, in this sense: everything that happens follows from the nature of God, just like how it follows from the nature of a triangle that its angles are equal to two right angles. Since God had to exist with the nature he has, nothing that has happened could have been avoided, and if God has fixed a particular fate for a particular mode, there is no escaping it. As Spinoza puts it, "A thing which has been determined by God to produce an effect cannot render itself undetermined."

Part II: Of the Nature & Origin of the Mind
The second part focuses on the human mind and body. Spinoza attacks several Cartesian positions: (1) that the mind and body are distinct substances that can affect one another; (2) that we know our minds better than we know our bodies; (3) that our senses may be trusted; (4) that despite being created by God we can make mistakes, namely, when we affirm, of our own free will, an idea that is not clear and distinct. Spinoza denies each of Descartes's points. Regarding (1), Spinoza argues that the mind and the body are a single thing that is being thought of in two different ways. The whole of nature can be fully described in terms of thoughts or in terms of bodies. However, we cannot mix these two ways of describing things, as Descartes does, and say that the mind affects the body or vice versa. Moreover, the mind's self-knowledge is not fundamental: it cannot know its own thoughts better than it knows the ways in which its body is acted upon by other bodies.

Further, there is no difference between contemplating an idea and thinking that it is true, and there is no freedom of the will at all. Sensory perception, which Spinoza calls "knowledge of the first kind", is entirely inaccurate, since it reflects how our own bodies work more than how things really are. We can also have a kind of accurate knowledge called "knowledge of the second kind", or "reason". This encompasses knowledge of the features common to all things, and includes principles of physics and geometry. We can also have "knowledge of the third kind", or "intuitive knowledge". This is a sort of knowledge that, somehow, relates particular things to the nature of God.

Part III: Of the Origin & Nature of Emotions

In the third part of the Ethics, Spinoza argues that all things, including human beings, strive to persevere their perfection of power in being unaffected. Spinoza states that virtue is equal to power (i.e., self-control).

Spinoza explains how this desire ("conatus") underlies the movement and complexity of our emotions and passions (i.e., joy and sadness that are building blocks for all other emotions). Our mind is in certain cases active, and in certain cases passive. In so far as it has adequate ideas it is necessarily active, and in so far as it has inadequate ideas, it is necessarily passive.

Definitions of the Affects

Part IV: Of the Servitude of Humanity, or the Strength of the Emotions
The fourth part analyzes human passions, which Spinoza sees as aspects of the mind that direct us outwards to seek what gives pleasure and shun what gives pain. The "bondage" he refers to is domination by these passions or "affects" as he calls them. Spinoza considers how the affects, ungoverned, can torment people and make it impossible for mankind to live in harmony with one another.

Part V: Of the Power of the Intellect, or the Liberty of Humanity
The fifth part argues that reason can govern the affects in the pursuit of virtue, which for Spinoza is self-preservation: only with the aid of reason can humans distinguish the passions that truly aid virtue from those that are ultimately harmful. By reason, we can see things as they truly are, sub specie aeternitatis, "under the aspect of eternity," and because Spinoza treats God and nature as indistinguishable, by knowing things as they are we improve our knowledge of God. Seeing that all things are determined by nature to be as they are, we can achieve the rational tranquility that best promotes our happiness, and liberate ourselves from being driven by our passions.

Themes

God or Nature
According to Spinoza, God is Nature and Nature is God (Deus sive Natura). This is his pantheism. In his previous book, Theologico-Political Treatise, Spinoza discussed the inconsistencies that result when God is assumed to have human characteristics. In the third chapter of that book, he stated that the word "God" means the same as the word "Nature". He wrote: "Whether we say ... that all things happen according to the laws of nature, or are ordered by the decree and direction of God, we say the same thing." He later qualified this statement in his letter to Oldenburg by abjuring materialism. Nature, to Spinoza, is a metaphysical substance, not physical matter. In this posthumously published book Ethics, he equated God with nature by writing "God or Nature" four times. "For Spinoza, God or Nature—being one and the same thing—is the whole, infinite, eternal, necessarily existing, active system of the universe within which absolutely everything exists. This is the fundamental principle of the Ethics...."

Spinoza holds that everything that exists is part of nature, and everything in nature follows the same basic laws. In this perspective, human beings are part of nature, and hence they can be explained and understood in the same way as everything else in nature. This aspect of Spinoza's philosophy — his naturalism — was radical for its time, and perhaps even for today. In the preface to Part III of Ethics (relating to emotions), he writes:

Therefore, Spinoza affirms that the passions of hatred, anger, envy, and so on, considered in themselves, "follow from this same necessity and efficacy of nature; they answer to certain definite causes, through which they are understood, and possess certain properties as worthy of being known as the properties of anything else". Humans are not different in kind from the rest of the natural world; they are part of it.

Spinoza's naturalism can be seen as deriving from his firm commitment to the principle of sufficient reason, which is the thesis that everything has an explanation.

And to continue with Spinoza's triangle example, here is one claim he makes about God:

Spinoza rejected the idea of an external Creator suddenly, and apparently capriciously, creating the world at one particular time rather than another, and creating it out of nothing. The solution appeared to him more perplexing than the problem, and rather unscientific in spirit as involving a break in continuity. He preferred to think of the entire system of reality as its own ground. This view was simpler; it avoided the impossible conception of creation out of nothing; and it was religiously more satisfying by bringing God and man into closer relationship. Instead of Nature, on the one hand, and a supernatural God, on the other, he posited one world of reality, at once Nature and God, and leaving no room for the supernatural. This so-called naturalism of Spinoza is only distorted if one starts with a crude materialistic idea of Nature and supposes that Spinoza degraded God. The truth is that he raised Nature to the rank of God by conceiving Nature as the fulness of reality, as the One and All. He rejected the specious simplicity obtainable by denying the reality of Matter, or of Mind, or of God. The cosmic system comprehends them all. In fact, God and Nature become identical when each is conceived as the Perfect Self-Existent. This constitutes Spinoza's Pantheism.

Structure of reality

According to Spinoza, God has "attributes". One attribute is 'extension', another attribute is 'thought', and there are infinitely many such attributes. Since Spinoza holds that to exist is to act, some readers take 'extension' to refer to an activity characteristic of bodies (for example, the active process of taking up space, exercising physical power, or resisting a change of place or shape). They take 'thought' to refer to the activity that is characteristic of minds, namely thinking, the exercise of mental power. Each attribute has modes. All bodies are modes of extension, and all ideas are modes of thought.

Substance, attributes, modes
Spinoza's ideas relating to the character and structure of reality are expressed by him in terms of substance, attributes, and modes. These terms are very old and familiar, but not in the sense in which Spinoza employs them. To understand Spinoza, it is necessary to lay aside all preconceptions about them, and follow Spinoza closely. Spinoza found it impossible to understand the finite, dependent, transient objects and events of experience without assuming some reality not dependent on anything else but self-existent, not produced by anything else but eternal, not restricted or limited by anything else but infinite. Such an uncaused, self-sustaining reality he called substance. So, for instance, he could not understand the reality of material objects and physical events without assuming the reality of a self-existing, infinite and eternal physical force which expresses itself in all the movements and changes which occur, as we say, in space.

This physical force he called extension, and described it, at first, as a substance, in the sense just explained. Similarly, he could not understand the various dependent, transient mental experiences with which we are familiar without assuming the reality of a self-existing, infinite and eternal consciousness, mental force, or mind-energy, which expresses itself in all these finite experiences of perceiving and understanding, of feeling and striving. This consciousness or mind-energy he called thought, and described it also, at first, as a substance. Each of these "substances" he regarded as infinite of its kind (that is, as exhaustive of all the events of its own kind), and as irreducible to the other, or any other, substance. But in view of the intimate way in which Extension and Thought express themselves conjointly in the life of man, Spinoza considered it necessary to conceive of Extension and Thought not as detached realities, but as constituting one organic whole or system. And in order to express this idea, he then described Extension and Thought as attributes, reserving the term Substance for the system which they constitute between them. This change of description was not intended to deny that Extension and Thought are substances in the sense of being self-existent, etc. It was only intended to express their coherence in one system. The system of course would be more than any one attribute. For each attribute is only infinite of its kind; the system of all attributes is absolutely infinite, that is, exhausts the whole of reality. Spinoza, accordingly, now restricted the term "substance" to the complete system, though he occasionally continued to use the phrase "substance or attribute", or described Extension as a substance.

As commonly used, especially since the time of Locke, the term substance is contrasted with its attributes or qualities as their substratum or bearer. But this meaning must not be read into Spinoza. For Spinoza, Substance is not the support or bearer of the Attributes, but the system of Attributes — he actually uses the expression "Substance or the Attributes." If there is any difference at all between "Substance" and "the Attributes", as Spinoza uses these terms, it is only the difference between the Attributes conceived as an organic system and the Attributes conceived (but not by Spinoza) as a mere sum of detached forces. Something is still necessary to complete the account of Spinoza's conception of Substance. So far only the two Attributes have been considered, namely, Extension and Thought. Spinoza, however, realised that there may be other Attributes, unknown to man. If so, they are part of the one Substance or cosmic system. And using the term "infinite" in the sense of "complete" or "exhaustive", he ascribed to Substance an infinity of Attributes, that is, all the attributes there are, whether known to man or not.

Now reality, for Spinoza, is activity. Substance is incessantly active, each Attribute exercising its kind of energy in all possible ways. Thus the various objects and events of the material world come into being as modes (modifications or states) of the attribute Extension; and the various minds and mental experiences come into being as modes of the attribute Thought (or Consciousness). These modes are not external creations of the Attributes, but immanent results — they are not "thrown off" by the Attributes, but are states (or modifications) of them, as air-waves are states of the air. Each Attribute, however, expresses itself in its finite modes not immediately (or directly) but mediately (or indirectly), at least in the sense to be explained now. Galilean physics tended to regard the whole world of physical phenomena as the result of differences of motion or momentum. And, though erroneously conceived, the Cartesian conception of a constant quantity of motion in the world led Spinoza to conceive of all physical phenomena as so many varying expressions of that store of motion (or motion and rest).

Spinoza might, of course, have identified Extension with energy of motion. But, with his usual caution, he appears to have suspected that motion may be only one of several types of physical energy. So he described motion simply as a mode of Extension, but as an infinite mode (because complete or exhaustive of all finite modes of motion) and as an immediate mode (as a direct expression of Extension). Again, the physical world (or "the face of the world as a whole", as Spinoza calls it) retains a certain sameness in spite of the innumerable changes in detail that are going on. Accordingly, Spinoza described also the physical world as a  whole as an infinite mode of extension ("infinite" because exhaustive of all facts and events that can be reduced to motion), but as a mediate (or indirect) mode, because he regarded it as the outcome of the conservation of motion (itself a mode, though an immediate mode). The physical things and events of ordinary experience are finite modes. In essence each of them is part of the Attribute Extension, which is active in each of them. But the finiteness of each of them is due to the fact that it is restrained or hedged in, so to say, by other finite modes. This limitation or determination is negation in the sense that each finite mode is not the whole attribute Extension; it is not the other finite modes. But each mode is positively real and ultimate as part of the Attribute.

In the same kind of way the Attribute Thought exercises its activity in various mental processes, and in such systems of mental process as are called minds or souls. But in this case, as in the case of Extension, Spinoza conceives of the finite modes of Thought as mediated by infinite modes. The immediate infinite mode of Thought he describes as "the idea of God"; the mediate infinite mode he calls "the infinite idea" or "the idea of all things". The other Attributes (if any) must be conceived in an analogous manner. And the whole Universe or Substance is conceived as one dynamic system of which the various Attributes are the several world-lines along which it expresses itself in all the infinite variety of events.

Given the persistent misinterpretation of Spinozism it is worth emphasizing the dynamic character of reality as Spinoza conceived it. The cosmic system is certainly a logical or rational system, according to Spinoza, for Thought is a constitutive part of it; but it is not merely a logical system — it is dynamic as well as logical. His frequent use of geometrical illustrations affords no evidence at all in support of a purely logico-mathematical interpretation of his philosophy; for Spinoza regarded geometrical figures, not in a Platonic or static manner, but as things traced out by moving particles or lines, etc., that is, dynamically.

Moral philosophy

For Spinoza, reality means activity, and the reality of anything expresses itself in a tendency to self-preservation — to exist is to persist. In the lowest kinds of things, in so-called inanimate matter, this tendency shows itself as a "will to live". Regarded physiologically the effort is called appetite; when we are conscious of it, it is called desire. The moral categories, good and evil, are intimately connected with desire, though not in the way commonly supposed. Man does not desire a thing because he thinks it is good, or shun it because he considers it bad; rather he considers anything good if he desires it, and regards it as bad if he has an aversion for it. Now whatever is felt to heighten vital activity gives pleasure; whatever is felt to lower such activity causes pain. Pleasure coupled with a consciousness of its external cause is called love, and pain coupled with a consciousness of its external cause is called hate — "love" and "hate" being used in the wide sense of "like" and "dislike". All human feelings are derived from pleasure, pain and desire. Their great variety is due to the differences in the kinds of external objects which give rise to them, and to the differences in the inner conditions of the individual experiencing them.

Spinoza gives a detailed analysis of the whole gamut of human feelings, and his account is one of the classics of psychology. For the present purpose the most important distinction is that between "active" feelings and "passive" feelings (or "passions"). Man, according to Spinoza, is active or free in so far as any experience is the outcome solely of his own nature; he is passive, or a bondsman, in so far as any experience is due to other causes besides his own nature. The active feelings are all of them forms of self-realisation, of heightened activity, of strength of mind, and are therefore always pleasurable. It is the passive feelings (or "passions") which are responsible for all the ills of life, for they are induced largely by things outside us and frequently cause that lowered vitality which means pain. Spinoza next links up his ethics with his theory of knowledge, and correlates the moral progress of man with his intellectual progress. At the lowest stage of knowledge, that of "opinion", man is under the dominant influence of things outside himself, and so is in the bondage of the passions. At the next stage, the stage of "reason", the characteristic feature of the human mind, its intelligence, asserts itself, and helps to emancipate him from his bondage to the senses and external allurements. The insight gained into the nature of the passions helps to free man from their domination. A better understanding of his own place in the cosmic system and of the place of all the objects of his likes and dislikes, and his insight into the necessity which rules all things, tend to cure him of his resentments, regrets and disappointments. He grows reconciled to things, and wins peace of mind. In this way reason teaches acquiescence in the universal order, and elevates the mind above the turmoil of passion. At the highest stage of knowledge, that of "intuitive knowledge", the mind apprehends all things as expressions of the eternal cosmos. It sees all things in God, and God in all things. It feels itself as part of the eternal order, identifying its thoughts with cosmic thought and its interests with cosmic interests. Thereby it becomes eternal as one of the eternal ideas in which the Attribute Thought expresses itself, and attains to that "blessedness" which "is not the reward of virtue, but virtue itself", that is, the perfect joy which characterises perfect self-activity. This is not an easy or a common achievement. "But", says Spinoza, "everything excellent is as difficult as it is rare."

Reception

Shortly after his death in 1677, Spinoza's works were placed on the Catholic Church's Index of Banned Books. Condemnations soon appeared, such as Aubert de Versé's L'impie convaincu (1685). According to its subtitle, in this work "the foundations of [Spinoza's] atheism are refuted". In June 1678 —just over a year after Spinoza's death—the States of Holland banned his entire works, since they “contain very many profane, blasphemous and atheistic propositions.” The prohibition included the owning, reading, distribution, copying, and restating of Spinoza's books, and even the reworking of his fundamental ideas.

For the next hundred years, if European philosophers read this so-called heretic, they did so almost entirely in secret. How much forbidden Spinozism they were sneaking into their diets remains a subject of continual intrigue. Locke, Hume, Leibniz and Kant all stand accused by later scholars of indulging in periods of closeted Spinozism. At the close of the 18th century, a controversy centering on the Ethics scandalized the German philosophy scene.

The first known translation of the Ethics into English was completed in 1856 by the novelist George Eliot, though not published until much later. The book next appeared in English in 1883, by the hand of the novelist Hale White. Spinoza rose clearly into view for anglophone metaphysicians in the late nineteenth century, during the British craze for Hegel. In his admiration for Spinoza, Hegel was joined in this period by his countrymen Schelling, Goethe, Schopenhauer and Nietzsche. In the twentieth century, the ghost of Spinoza continued to show itself, for example in the writings of Russell, Wittgenstein, Davidson, and Deleuze. Among writers of fiction and poetry, the influential thinkers inspired by Spinoza include Coleridge, George Eliot, Melville, Borges, and Malamud.

The first published Dutch translations were by the poet Herman Gorter (1895) and by Willem Meyer (1896).

Criticism

Number of attributes 
Spinoza's contemporary, Simon de Vries, raised the objection that Spinoza fails to prove that substances may possess multiple attributes, but that if substances have only a single attribute, "where there are two different attributes, there are also different substances". This is a serious weakness in Spinoza's logic, which has yet to be conclusively resolved. Some have attempted to resolve this conflict, such as Linda Trompetter, who writes that "attributes are singly essential properties, which together constitute the one essence of a substance", but this interpretation is not universal, and Spinoza did not clarify the issue in his response to de Vries. On the other hand, Stanley Martens states that "an attribute of a substance is that substance; it is that substance insofar as it has a certain nature" in an analysis of Spinoza's ideas of attributes.

Misuse of words
Schopenhauer claimed that Spinoza misused words. "Thus he calls 'God' that which is everywhere called 'the world'; 'justice' that which is everywhere called 'power'; and 'will' that which is everywhere called 'judgement'." Also, "that concept of substance...with the definition of which Spinoza accordingly begins...appears on close and honest investigation to be a higher yet unjustified abstraction of the concept matter." In spite of his repeated objections and critical remarks, Schopenhauer incorporated some of Spinoza's fundamental concepts into his system, especially concerning the theory of emotions; there was also a striking similarity between Schopenhauer's will and Spinoza's substance.

Critical influence
In fact, within the German philosophical sphere, Spinoza's influence on German idealism was remarkable. He was both a challenge and inspiration for the three major figures of this movement: Hegel, Schelling and Fichte — who all sought to define their own philosophical positions in relation to his. Schopenhauer, who detested these three philosophers to varying degrees of intensity, also had a similarly ambivalent relation to the Dutch philosopher. How Spinoza came to influence Schopenhauer is not clear, but one might speculate: it could have come from his exposure to Fichte's lectures, from his conversations with Goethe or simply from being caught up in the post-Kantian attempt to rethink the critical philosophy. Still, his engagement with Spinozism is evident throughout his writings and attentive readers of his chief work may indeed note his ambivalence toward Spinoza's philosophy. He sees in Spinoza an ally against the feverish culture of the West. For example, in the context of a rather favourable account of "the standpoint of affirmation" he notes that "[T]he philosophy of Bruno and that of Spinoza might also bring to this standpoint the person whose conviction was not shaken or weakened by their errors and imperfections". Moreover, in discussing Spinoza and Giordano Bruno, Schopenhauer also affirms that:

Given Schopenhauer's respect for Hindu philosophy, comments like these indicate that he too felt intellectual kinship with Spinoza. Elsewhere, Schopenhauer points to more fundamental affinities, but he also criticizes Spinoza. These criticisms deal with fundamental disagreements about the ultimate nature of reality and whether it is to be affirmed or denied.

See also

 Natura naturans
 Natura naturata
 Nature connectedness
 Opera Posthuma
 Pantheism
 Philosophy of Spinoza

References

External links

 The 1887 translation of the Ethics into English by R. H. M. Elwes is available in two places:
 Wikisource
 Project Gutenberg
 Original Latin text on Wikisource
 EthicaDB hosts translations in several languages.
 EarlyModernTexts contains a simplified and abridged translation of the Ethics, by Jonathan Bennett
 

Ethics books
1677 books
Works by Baruch Spinoza
Books published posthumously
Books about emotions